Eupithecia stypheliae is a moth of the family Geometridae. It was first described by Otto Herman Swezey in 1948. It is endemic to the island of Hawaii.

The larvae feed on Styphelia tameiameiae.

References

External links

Moths described in 1948
stypheliae
Endemic moths of Hawaii